Hassan Khalil Daher (born 4 March 1983) is a Lebanese former professional footballer who played as a centre-back.

Club career
Daher began his senior career at Lebanese Premier League side Shabab Sahel, during the 2004–05 season. After one season in the Premier League, Shabab Sahel relegated to the Lebanese Second Division. During the 2005–06 Lebanese Second Division, Daher helped his side finish first and gain promotion back to the Premier League. In 2010–11, Daher was awarded for having played the most minutes in the league: 1980. In 2012–13 Daher was included in the Lebanese Premier League Team of the Season.

Daher remained at Shabab Sahel for 10 seasons, before signing for Malaysia Super League side Perak in April 2014. The Lebanese defender made his debut in Malaysia against Selangor. In September 2014 Daher moved back to Lebanon, signing for Ahed. In his first season at Ahed, Daher helped his team win the 2014–15 Lebanese Premier League. The following season, Daher won the 2015 Lebanese Elite Cup, and the 2015 Lebanese Super Cup. In 2016 Daher moved to Nabi Chit, where he retired two years later.

International career
Daher made his international debut for Lebanon on 3 March 2010, in a 2011 AFC Asian Cup qualifier against Syria. Lebanon lost the encounter 4–0. Daher participated at the 2014 WAFF Championship in Qatar. He was also named in the 23-man squad for the 2014 World Cup qualifier against Uzbekistan, but remained on the bench for the match. Daher played nine games for Lebanon, between 2010 and 2013.

Honours 
Shabab Sahel
 Lebanese Second Division: 2005–06

Ahed
 Lebanese Premier League: 2014–15
 Lebanese Elite Cup: 2015
 Lebanese Super Cup: 2015

Individual
 Lebanese Premier League Team of the Season: 2008–09, 2012–13
 Lebanese Premier League most appearances: 2010–11

See also 

 List of Lebanon international footballers born outside Lebanon

References

External links

 
 
 

1983 births
Living people
Lebanese footballers
Association football defenders
Lebanese Premier League players
Shabab Al Sahel FC players
Lebanese expatriate footballers
Expatriate footballers in Malaysia
Lebanese expatriate sportspeople in Malaysia
Malaysia Premier League players
Perak F.C. players
Al Ahed FC players
Al Nabi Chit SC players
Lebanon international footballers